The Nepalese Army Air Service is the army aviation branch of the Nepali Army, also known as the Nepal Army Air Wing (formerly Royal Nepalese Air Force). Nepal has no separate Air Force but the Nepalese Army operates several aircraft within the army aviation branch.

History
The Nepalese Army Air Service was formed in the 1960s, but became an air force unit in 1979. Finally, it is now again a part of the Army. It has limited combat capabilities as only few helicopters can be armed. The main objective of this flying element is transport, flying paratroopers and assistance in case of an emergency (e.g. natural disasters). Apart from the 11th Brigade the country has established a VIP Flight from Tribhuvan Airport, mostly the aircraft are stationed at Kathmandu, Surkhet and Dipayal.

From 1996 to 2006 the country was in civil war against Maoist rebels who strove to overthrow the constitutional monarchy and establish a republic. Their attacks increased since the massacre of the Royal Family in 2001. This development led to the need for armed helicopters. Several types of aircraft have entered service since: MI-17s, M28 Skytruck, HAL Lancer and HAL Dhruv. The UK has delivered two Britten-Norman Islanders and two MI-17s free of charge. China decided to supply an MA-60 (a Y-7 derivative). Nepal has also purchased HAL Cheetah and HAL Chetak helicopters.

In November 2014, India gave an HAL Dhruv as part of a strategic pact.

The NAAS consists of about 500 members.

Aircraft

Current Inventory

Facilities

In all Nepal there are 36 airfields that are able to support military operations.  See also the full list of airports in Nepal

 Tribhuvan International Airport, Kathmandu,
 Chandragadhi Airport, Chandragadhi
 Biratnagar Airport, Biratnagar
 Janakpur Airport Janakpur
 Simara Airport, Pipara Simara
 Bharatpur Airport, Bharatpur
 Meghauli Airport, Bharatpur
 Pokhara Airport, Pokhara
 Jomsom Airport, Mustang
 Dang Airport, Tribhuvannagar
 Nepalgunj Airport, Nepalgunj
 Surkhet Airport, Birendranagar
 Jumla Airport, Jumla
 Silgadhi Airport, Doti/Dipayal
 Mahendranagar Airport, Mahendranagar
 Dhangadhi Airport, Dhangadhi
 Pokhara International Airport,Pokhara

Army pilots training School
The Nepalese Army Air Service has its flying and helicopter pilots training school since 2004 within the No 11. Brigade and is the only helicopter pilot training school in Nepal.

Along with the army air service pilots, the school also produces civilian pilots. The school provides training using Mi-17, Bell and Ecureuil helicopters.

Accidents and incidents 
 On 27 February 1970, a Nepalese Royal Flight de Havilland Canada DHC-6 Twin Otter crashed while taking off at Jomsom Airport killing one passenger. Three passengers and one crew member survived but the plane was written off.
 On 13 September 1972, a Royal Nepalese Air Force Douglas DC-3 crashed when it hit a high tension powerline during a flight in Panchkhal. All 31 occupants of the aircraft were killed.
 On 30 December 1985, a Nepal Army Air Wing Short SC.7 Skyvan crashed in jungle near Dhangadi killing all 25 soldiers aboard.
 On 10 July 1991, a Nepal Army Air Wing de Havilland Twin Otter en route from Surkhet to Jumla was destroyed, killing 3 people, when hit a hillside. Later analysis showed the altimeter had given an incorrect reading.
 On 18 October 2011, a Nepal Army Air Wing Britten-Norman BN-2 Islander performing an ambulance flight from Nepalgunj to Kathmandu crashed near Dhorpatan, Baglung District and caught fire. None of the six occupants survived the accident.
 On 30 May 2017, a Nepal Army Air Wing PZL M28 Skytruck (Registration NA-048) crashed at Bajura Airport while the pilot was undertaking a forced landing due to bad weather. The cargo airplane was supposed to land at Simikot Airport in Humla District. However, bad weather condition forced the pilot to divert towards Bajura. The pilot died and two others were injured.

See also
Armed Police Force Nepal
Military of Nepal
National Investigation Department of Nepal
Nepalese Police Force

References

External links
Nepal Army Air Wing (scramble.nl)
Official website of the Nepal Army

Nepali Army
 
Army aviation units and formations
Nepalese Army Air Service
1965 establishments in Nepal